Khalil Sultan was the Timurid ruler of Transoxiana from 18 February 1405 to 1409. He was a son of Miran Shah and a grandson of Timur.

Biography

During Timur's lifetime, Khalil Sultan gained Timur's particular favor. He distinguished himself during the campaign in India and in 1402 was given rule of the Ferghana Valley. Upon Timur's death in 1405 Khalil viewed himself as his successor. Timur's appointed successor Pir Muhammad was quickly cast aside, and Khalil gained control of Samarkand. Khalil gained Timur's treasury and bestowed the puppet title of Chagatai Khan (which before had always been granted by Timur to a descendant of Genghis Khan to legitimize his rule) to a Timurid prince. Khalil also gained an ally, Sultan Husayn Tayichiud, who had previously also made claims to the throne as a grandson of Timur.

Meanwhile, Shahrukh Mirza, who was ruling in Herat, also decided to press his claims. He advanced to the Oxus River against Khalil but turned back when Khalil's father Miran Shah, as well as his brother Abu Bakr ibn Miran Shah, marched from Azerbaijan in support. Nevertheless, Khalil's position began to weaken. He was unpopular in Samarkand, where the nobility despised his wife Shad Mulk. The latter had considerable influence over Khalil, convincing him to appoint people of so-called low birth to high positions at the expense of the nobility. A famine caused him to be even more despised. He decided to return to the Ferghana Valley with his former mentor, Khudaidad Hussain, who went to Moghulistan (the realm of the eastern Chagatai Khans) in an attempt to win their support. However, Persian historian Khwandamir instead claims that Khudaidad Hussain began a civil war against Khalil and took him prisoner, delivering him along with his territory to eastern Chagatai Khan Shams-i-Jahan (r. 1399–1408). Shams-i-Jahan, however, had Khudaidad Hussain executed for his treason to Khalil and returned Khalil his kingdom.

Khalil's rule in Samarkand finally ended when Shahrukh Mirza entered the city unopposed on May 13, 1409. Transoxiana was then given to Shahrukh Mirza's son Ulugh Beg. Khalil decided to surrender to Shahrukh Mirza, who had captured Shad Mulk. He received his wife back, and was appointed governor of Ray. He died there in 1411. His wife committed suicide shortly after his death.

Personal life
Consorts
Khalil had three wives:
Jahan Sultan Agha, daughter of Ali Mirza Arlat;
Shad Malik Agha;
Mother of Ali Mirza;

Sons
Khalil had four sons:
Ali Mirza - mother's name unknown;
Muhammad Bahadur Mirza - Jahan Sultan Agha;
Berkul Mirza - Jahan Sultan Agha;
Muhammad Bayqara Mirza - Shad Malik Agha;

Daughters
Khalil had three daughters:
Khichak Agha, Shirin Beg Agha - with Jahan Sultan Agha;
Saray Malik Agha - with Shad Malik Agha;
Sultan Badi-al-Mulk Agha - with Shad Malik Agha, married to Ulugh Beg, son of Shah Rukh;

Ancestry

Notes

References
 Roemer, H. R. "The Successors of Timur." The Cambridge History of Iran Volume 6: The Timurid and Safavid Periods. Edited by Peter Jackson. New York: Cambridge University Press, 1986. 

1384 births
1411 deaths
Timurid monarchs
15th-century monarchs in Asia